Sergei Aleksandrovich Korshunov (8 October 1928 – 12 December 1982) was an association footballer from the former Soviet Union who played for FC Dynamo Kyiv and Moscow teams.

In 1956 Korshunov played couple of games for Ukraine at the Spartakiad of the Peoples of the USSR.

References

1928 births
1982 deaths
Footballers from Moscow
Soviet footballers
Soviet Top League players
FC Dynamo Moscow players
FC Spartak Moscow players
PFC CSKA Moscow players
FC Dynamo Kyiv players
FC Metalurh Zaporizhzhia players
Soviet football managers
FC Metalurh Zaporizhzhia managers
FC Gomel managers
FC Karpaty Lviv managers
FC Desna Chernihiv managers
FC Spartak Vladikavkaz managers
FK Daugava Rīga managers
Association football forwards